Mandate was a monthly gay pornographic magazine. It was published in the United States and distributed internationally since April, 1975. Together with the other magazines of the Mavety Group, such as Black Inches, it folded in 2009.

History
Modernismo Publications, Ltd. (MP) were publishers of Mandate, Honcho, and Playguy, popular gay men's magazines. MP was founded in 1974 by George Mavety with the publication of Dilettante, which folded in March 1975. The following month, its successor, Mandate, appeared on the newsstands under the editorship of John Devere.

Mandate was conceived as a magazine of erotica, news and entertainment for gay men. Each monthly issue, in addition to exhibiting artistic displays of male nudes and erotic fiction, contained reviews of books, motion pictures and sound recordings of interest to the gay community and reported on social, political and cultural events related to the movement for gay liberation.

Joseph Arsenault succeeded Devere as editor. By the time Sam Staggs succeeded to its editorship, following Arsenault, Mandate claimed a circulation of over 100,000 and enjoyed a reputation as the most important gay men's magazine in America. Staggs' dream was to make it the gay equivalent of Playboy or Penthouse.

Following the death of editor and novelist Stan Leventhal, the neglected Mandate was revitalized by Doug McClemont. McClemont was appointed Editor-in-Chief during the crucial period of the mid-1990s when gay sexuality was arguably at its most transitional point. The AIDS crisis had altered the way porn and same-sex relations were perceived by the general public.

See also
List of gay pornographic magazines

References

External links
ModernHomo: The Origin of Mandate Magazine

Pornographic magazines published in the United States
Defunct magazines published in the United States
Gay male pornography in the United States
Gay male pornographic magazines
Magazines established in 1975
Magazines disestablished in 2009